Richard Garfinkle (born 1961) is an American writer of science fiction.

He is best known as the author of Celestial Matters, a novel published by Tor Books, which won the Compton Crook Award in 1997.

Garfinkle is a 1992 graduate of the Clarion West Writers' Workshop and was nominated twice for the John W. Campbell Award for Best New Writer.

He has taught at numerous writers' workshops at Windycon, an annual Chicago-area science fiction convention, and at Chicon 2000, the 58th World Science Fiction Convention, held in Chicago.

Bibliography
 Celestial Matters (novel, Tor Books, April 1996). 
 All of an Instant (novel, Tor Books, November 1999).  One of the most original sci fi novels of all time.  
 "The Last Invasion of Ireland" in Once Upon a Galaxy, Wil McCarthy, Martin H. Greenberg, and John Helfers, eds. (collection, Daw Books, September 2002). 
  Three Steps to the Universe: From the Sun to Black Holes to the Mystery of Dark Matter (nonfiction, with brother David Garfinkle, University of Chicago Press, November 2008). 
 Exaltations  (novel, Achronal Press, June 2009). 
 Wayland's Principia (novel, Achronal Press, August 2009).

References

External links

Richard Garfinkle's website

Living people
1961 births
20th-century American novelists
21st-century American novelists
American alternate history writers
American science fiction writers
American science writers
American fantasy writers
American male novelists
Writers from New York City
University of Chicago people
Writers from Chicago
Writers of historical fiction set in antiquity
20th-century American male writers
21st-century American male writers
Novelists from New York (state)
Novelists from Illinois
20th-century American non-fiction writers
21st-century American non-fiction writers
American male non-fiction writers